William Purves  may refer to:
 William Purves (banker) (born 1931), Scottish banker
 William Purves (rugby union) (active 1912–1913), Scottish rugby union player
 Bill Purves (born 1870), Irish professional footballer
 William Laidlaw Purves (1842–1917), Scottish-born surgeon

See also
William Purvis (disambiguation)